Benjamin Schwarz (born October 20, 1963) is an American editor and writer. He has written articles, essays, monographs, and reviews on an array of subjects—from fashion to the American South, from current fiction to the archaeology, from national security to architecture, from the history of slavery to the history of childhood, and from international economics to Hollywood.

Early life
Schwarz was born on October 20, 1963. He holds a B.A. and an M.A. in history from Yale University, where he held the Woodrow Wilson National Fellowship Foundation's Mellon Fellowship in the Humanities. Schwarz was a Fulbright scholar at Magdalen College, Oxford.

Career 
Schwarz was the literary and the national editor of The Atlantic from 2000 to 2013. In addition to writing, assigning, and editing prominent feature articles for the magazine, Schwarz ran, and wrote a regular column for, the Atlantic'''s cultural and literary department, which under his editorship expanded its coverage to include popular culture and manners and mores, as well as books and ideas.  The Los Angeles Times wrote that Schwarz had "reshaped the venerable magazine's book section into the shrewdest, best-written and most surprising cultural report currently on offer between slick covers." The writers and friends he recruited to the Books section included Perry Anderson, Caitlin Flanagan, Sandra Tsing Loh, Christopher Hitchens, Cristina Nehring, Joseph O'Neill, Terry Castle, Mona Simpson, Clive James, and B. R. Myers. Articles in Schwarz's section were National Magazine Award finalists or winners in the Criticism category from 2000 to 2009. The Columbia Journalism Review described Schwarz as "the magazine's in-house intellectual." As a national correspondent for The Atlantic from 1995 to 2000, Schwarz wrote a series of provocative essays and reported articles that argued for a far more diminished global role for the United States. He also wrote a series of pieces on historical and literary subjects.

From 1995 to 1998 Schwarz was the executive editor of World Policy Journal, where his chief mission was to bolster the coverage of cultural issues, international economics, and military affairs. For several years he was a foreign policy analyst at the RAND Corporation, where he researched and wrote on American global strategy, counterinsurgency, counterterrorism, and military doctrine. At RAND Schwarz wrote a widely cited and highly critical assessment of American counterinsurgency doctrine and practice. Schwarz was also a staff member of the Brookings Institution. In 1999 Schwarz won the Nona Balakian Citation for Excellence in Reviewing from the National Book Critics Circle.

Schwarz is a consulting editor-at-large at Yale University Press. From 2014 through 2017, he was the national editor of The American Conservative, where he commissioned articles by writers on the left and wrote a series of articles on postwar social changes in Great Britain and on gentrification in the contemporary American city. He is writing a biography of Winston Churchill, to be published by HarperCollins.

Personal life
His wife, Christina, is the author of the bestselling novel, Drowning Ruth''.

References

External links 
 

1963 births
Living people
American literary editors
American magazine editors
Yale University alumni
Alumni of the University of Oxford